Dawn is a station on the Port Authority of Allegheny County's light rail network, located in the Beechview neighborhood of Pittsburgh, Pennsylvania. The street level stop located in an especially hilly portion of a neighborhood known for its rolling terrain, providing access to commuters within walking distance. The station is located along the South Busway at the south end of the Palm Garden trestle and also serves as a transfer opportunity to the one city bus that stops at the same location.

History
The original Dawn stop was established at the south end of the Palm Garden trestle where Dawn Avenue crossed the Pittsburgh Railways trolley right of way. In the 1950s the stop was served by the 38 Mt. Lebanon, 39 Brookline, 42 Dormont, and 43 Neeld services. Just south of the stop was a junction where the line continued on to West Liberty Avenue (service 38 and 39) with the branch to the west proceeding to Broadway (service 42 and 43). When the 38 Mt Lebanon line along West Liberty Avenue was abandoned on May 25, 1963, it was combined with the 42 Dormont and renumbered as 42/38 Mt. Lebanon/Beechview. However, the 42 Dormont continued as a separate service but for rush hour use only. All lines, except the 39 Brookline, eventually became the 42 South Hills Village, the current Red Line. The 39 Brookline was abandoned on Sep 3, 1966.

Bus connections
41 Bower Hill

References

External links 

Port Authority T Stations Listings

Port Authority of Allegheny County stations
Railway stations in the United States opened in 1987
Red Line (Pittsburgh)
South Busway